is a Japanese manga artist best known for creating the manga Bastard!!.

Biography
He originally began as an assistant to hentai manga artist Dirty Matsumoto, and then as an assistant to manga artist Izumi Matsumoto in the production of Kimagure Orange Road, creating his own stories in his spare time. He debuted in Weekly Shonen Jump with two short stories, Binetsu Rouge (in 1987) and Virgin Tyrant (in 1988). He has also supervised, co-written and illustrated three Bastard!! related novels for the Jump! J Books imprint.

His group of assistants are called Studio Loud In School. They regularly publish a best-selling dōjinshi, Wonderful Megadeth, as well as various dōjinshi featuring popular fighting games such as Dead or Alive, Virtua Fighter and various Capcom games. In 2012, he designed the armor for two jobs (Geomancer and Rune Fencer) in the 2013 Final Fantasy XI expansion, Seekers of Adoulin.

Hagiwara is a high school drop-out, however he is a graduate from Tokyo Designer Gakuin College.

Works

References

External links
 Official website 
 SHOPPAGE, Hagiwara's official shop 
    
 

1963 births
Living people
Manga artists from Tokyo
Anime character designers